Jan Nilsson (born 26 February 1947) is a Swedish luger. He competed in the men's singles and doubles events at the 1968 Winter Olympics.

References

External links
 

1947 births
Living people
Swedish male lugers
Olympic lugers of Sweden
Lugers at the 1968 Winter Olympics
People from Ragunda Municipality
Sportspeople from Jämtland County